Clandestine Culture (stylized as CLANDESTINE CULTURE) is an American contemporary artist working in Miami, Florida. He had his first solo gallery exhibition in 2012.

Background
Clandestine Culture was born in 1970 and moved to Miami in the early 1990s. By the year 2000 he started working as an urban artist. In 2012 he had his first solo show. He has had several group exhibitions. In 2013, he took part at the Scope Art Fair during "Art Basel Miami Beach". In the year 2014, his second solo show was presented at the Gregg Shienbaum Fine Art gallery. He works in many different formats; from painting and sculpture to street art installations.

Work

The artist is known for his strong social criticism and portrayal of taboo subjects, often in a disturbing or controversial way. His work is produced in a variety of mediums, which includes works on paper, canvas, neon and banners. One of the works invited to a round table on taboo issues is "Sex Shouldn't Be a Crime". Displayed during his second solo show at the Gregg Shienbaum Fine Art Gallery, this particular work references the topic of "legal prostitution". Culture also produces street art.  Large format images are painted on paper with latex paint, and are glued to walls using the wheatpaste method.

On July 20, 2013, Culture created the Banner Project. The concept of the project was to raise or hang flags around the city of Miami as art installations. The first flag was raised over Julia Tuttle Causeway. The banner was 10 ft x 16 ft, constructed of synthetic fabric, and painted with latex paint. It featured a black and white image of a police officer in riot gear, with a red "Clandestine Culture" logo stamped at the bottom. It was raised on high-mast lighting, at a height of 30 metres (98 ft). The method used to raise the flag has not yet been revealed. The flag remained for five days until it was removed by the Florida Highway Patrol. In the summer of 2014 another Banner Project took place, this time in the Miami Marine Stadium. The size and materials were similar to the one used on the Julia Tuttle Causeway. In December of the same year, Culture displayed another piece in front of the Miami Beach Convention Center, during Art Basel Miami Beach 2014.

Exhibitions
The artist had his first gallery show in 2012.

Clandestine Culture. First Solo Show took place in Gregg Shienbaum Fine Art gallery on October 12, 2012.
Clandestine Culture. Second Solo Show took place in Gregg Shienbaum Fine Art gallery on May 8, 2014.

References

External links

 Official website 
 Clandestine Culture – First Solo Show on the Gregg Shienbaum website
 http://www.artnet.com/artists/clandestine-culture/  
 Gregg Shienbaum interview discussing Clandestine Culture
 Miami Herald article referencing Clandestine Culture

Street artists
Living people
Artists from Miami
1970 births
American contemporary artists